WAWA was a radio station licensed to West Allis, Wisconsin, serving the Milwaukee area, located at 1590 AM. Its studio and transmitter were located in Elm Grove. For the station's entire existence, WAWA was the sister station to WAWA-FM (later WLUM-FM).

The station signed on the air in 1961, and signed off in 1988, when the owner returned the license to the FCC. Since the FCC no longer re-licenses daytime-only stations, the 1590 AM frequency allocation in the Milwaukee market is considered to be permanently deleted.

History
Originally airing an adult standards format, WAWA quickly found success playing rhythm and blues music, starting in 1963. The format was popular with Milwaukee's African-American community, and was a serious rival to WNOV during the 1960s, 1970s and 1980s. They also simulcast part-time with their FM sister station at 102.1 FM, later carrying the WLUM call letters, with their sister station. All-Pro Broadcasting purchased both stations in 1979. In 1988, they were able to buy a stronger station at 1290 AM. Since FCC rules at the time would not allow them to keep both AM stations, and because they were unable to sell WAWA, they signed 1590 AM off the air for good and returned the station's license to the FCC. WAWA's format and programming were subsequently moved to 1290 AM.

References

External links
FCC History Cards for WAWA (covering 1958-1981)
WAWA playlist from May 24, 1965
Airchecks from WAWA 1590 (from Airchexx.com)
Article from the Milwaukee Sentinel, January 4, 1974

AWA
Defunct radio stations in the United States
Radio stations established in 1961
African-American history of Milwaukee
African-American history of Wisconsin
Radio stations disestablished in 1988
1961 establishments in Wisconsin
1988 disestablishments in Wisconsin
AWA
AWA